Mike Gunn (born 10 May 1964) is a British stand-up comedian, presenter, actor, writer, and voiceover artiste. He is most notable for his performance on Michael McIntyre's Comedy Roadshow and for appearing in nine episodes of Al Murray's Time Gentlemen Please.

Early life 
Born in Barnet, Gunn is married and has two boys. He attended Collingwood Secondary Modern school and went on to do an OND in Business at Brooklands. However, drink and drug problems forced him to drop out after the first year. 
Struggling with drug addiction, Gunn took on many varied jobs, including packing pickled gherkins in the Netherlands, manufacturing irrigation pipes in Israel, and repairing photocopiers in London.
In the late 1980s he attended Clouds House, a 12-step drug treatment centre for his heroin addiction, and has been drug-free ever since. It was during his rehabilitation that he took up stand-up comedy, performing his first gig at Jacksons Lane Community Centre, North London, in 1995.

Career

Stand-up comedy 
Gunn spent a few years on the comedy circuit performing as himself, but soon took on a different persona as a funeral director. This character act culminated in his first solo Edinburgh show, which was entitled "Good Grief" (2002). 
Just a year later, Gunn made his second Edinburgh solo appearance with "Uncut", an honest and funny narrative exploring his 10 years as an addict, and following through to his recovery. It was highly acclaimed and received an Arts Council grant, leading to it being performed for years all over the UK, in treatment centres, prisons, and schools, to anyone who had an interest in addiction and recovery from addiction.

In 2012 Gunn teamed up with fellow comedian Sean Collins and embarked on a UK tour with their show "Still on the Roadshow".
He has supported Jo Brand and Alan Davies on national tours and is on the road again this year (2014), with Lee Mack on his forthcoming tour "Hit The Road Mack".

He has performed internationally in countries including the Netherlands, Ireland, Germany, Hong Kong, Saudi Arabia, Switzerland, New Zealand, and Australia, where he completed a five-week sell out run at Melbourne's International Comedy Festival. Gunn became the first comedian to play in Kuatan, East Malaysia and has also entertained troops in the Falkland Islands.

Shortlisted for Time Out Dubai – Music & Nightlife Awards: Best Comedy Gig as part of The Laughter Factory along with Justin Moorhouse and Paul Sinha. The show received "Highly Commended" for Best Comedy Gig.

TV appearances and filmography 
Gunn has appeared in various programs, both as an actor, and as himself.

Other appearances include Harry Hill's TV Burp (ITV), Celebrity Deal or no Deal (Channel 4), Soccer AM (SKY1), The Comedy Store, and The World Stands Up (Comedy Central), and Gunn is a regular on the Sky Poker channel (SKY).

Other 
Gunn spent four years educating young children about drugs by working on the 2Smart4Drugs roadshow, which was funded by Essex police.

Hen has been a contributor for The Guardian, and has also written for Time Out, The List, The 11 O'clock Show (Channel 4) and Match of The Day Magazine.

References

External links 
 Official website
 Official Twitter Account
 Mike Gunn's Management

1964 births
Living people
English male comedians
English stand-up comedians